Nikki Johnson (born 26 June 1975) is a Canadian former basketball player who competed in the 2000 Summer Olympics.

References

1975 births
Living people
Canadian women's basketball players
Olympic basketball players of Canada
Basketball players at the 2000 Summer Olympics
Place of birth missing (living people)